Keith Sweat (born July 22, 1961) is an American singer, songwriter, record producer, and an early figure in the new jack swing musical movement. He is known for his collection of hits including "I Want Her", "Make It Last Forever", "I'll Give All My Love to You", "Make You Sweat", "Get Up on It", "Twisted" and "Nobody". He has released 13 solo albums (2 as a part of the R&B supergroup LSG) and discovered the groups Silk and Kut Klose.

Early life
Keith Sweat was born in Harlem, New York City, to Juanita Thompson, a hairdresser, and Charles Sweat, a factory worker. Juanita raised their five children alone after Charles Sweat's death in 1973.

He worked as a night stock boy at Macy's Department Store, and then a mail room clerk at Paine Webber, a brokerage firm. In just four years he worked his way up to a lucrative brokerage assistant job on the floor of the New York Stock Exchange. Sweat also worked as a supervisor for the New York Mercantile Exchange.

Career

1975–1984: Career beginnings with Jamilah
Sweat started his musical career as a member of a Harlem band called Jamilah in 1975. With the help of Jamilah, Sweat was able to hone his craft as a lead singer by performing regionally throughout the tri-State area of New York, New Jersey and Connecticut. The group was started by bassist Larry Peoples, guitarist Michael Samuels, and drummer Walter Bradley.

After leaving the group in 1984 to begin a solo career, he sang at nightclubs throughout New York City and landed a chance to record for the independent label, Stadium Records. Sweat recorded only two tunes for Stadium, "Lucky Seven", and "My Mind Is Made Up", which was their third and fourth ever release, but on Stadium's first release, he is credited as co-writer and co-producer of "You Are the One for Me", the last recording ever made by the group GQ. One of GQ's original members is his uncle, Keith "Sabu" Crier.

1987–1991: Make It Last Forever, I'll Give All My Love to You, and Keep It Comin
Later in 1987, Keith Sweat was discovered by Vincent Davis and offered a recording contract with his label, Vintertainment Records, which was founded in 1983 on the foundations of early Hip-Hop and otherwise best known for releasing Joeski Love's "Pee Wee's Dance" in 1985. Vintertainment was distributed by Elektra Records from 1985 until it ceased operations in 1990. On November 24, 1987, Sweat released his debut solo studio album Make It Last Forever, which sold three million copies. The biggest hit from this album was the song that inaugurated the new jack swing era "I Want Her" (No. 1 R&B & No. 5 Pop), which was nominated for the 1989 Soul Train Best R&B/Urban Contemporary Song of the Year award, while the title track from the album hit No. 2 on the R&B charts. Sweat reached the charts again with his second album I'll Give All My Love to You (1990) which hit No. 6 on the Billboard 200 chart. He released his third album, Keep It Comin' in 1991, which debuted in the Top 20 of the album chart. He produced soul singer Omar Chandler.

1992–2001: Get Up on It, Keith Sweat/LSG 
In 1992, Sweat discovered the group Silk, and helped craft their debut album, Lose Control, which hit No. 7 on the Billboard 200 album chart. 

The album's single "Freak Me" hit No. 1 on the Billboard Hot 100 on May 1, 1993. In 1993, Sweat discovered the Atlanta-based female R&B group Kut Klose. Sweat also produced the group's debut album Surrender, which produced their biggest hit single "I Like", peaking to No. 8 on the Hot R&B/Hip-Hop Singles & Tracks chart.

Sweat released his fourth album Get Up on It in the summer of 1994, and his self-titled fifth album in 1996. Both albums reached the top ten on the Billboard 200. The single co/produced and written by Eric McCaine "Twisted" featuring R&B group Kut Klose hit No. 2 on the Billboard Hot 100 and "Nobody" hit No. 3, which made them Sweat's biggest hits to date. "Just A Touch" was a cover of the 1979 song "Just a Touch of Love" by Slave. He produced R&B group Dru Hill in 1996.

In the fall of 1997, Sweat discovered the group Ol' Skool and helped with their self-titled debut. He was on their biggest single, "Am I Dreaming", which featured the R&B group Xscape. Sweat also formed the R&B supergroup LSG with Gerald Levert and Johnny Gill, and released their self-titled debut album Levert.Sweat.Gill in 1997. That album featured "My Body", which became a hit single. The album was certified double platinum and reached No. 4 on the U.S. Billboard 200.

Sweat's sixth album, Still in the Game was released in 1998, hitting No. 6 on the Billboard 200, and No. 2 on the R&B/Hip Hop albums chart. It featured the singles "Come and Get With Me" (which featured Snoop Dogg) (No. 12 Hot 100) and "I'm Not Ready" (No. 16 Hot 100). Sweat's success on the charts started to diminish in 2000, when he released the album Didn't See Me Coming. None of the singles from the album reached the top forty.

2002–present: Rebirth, Just Me, Ridin Solo, and Til the Morning
On August 13, 2002, Keith Sweat released his eighth album, Rebirth. The single "One on One" reached No. 75 on the Billboard Hot 100 and No. 44 on the Hot R&B/Hip-Hop Singles & Tracks chart.His 2008 album Just Me included the single, "Love U Better (featuring Keyshia Cole)". Sweat is currently signed to Kedar Records and released his tenth studio album entitled Ridin' Solo on June 22, 2010. The lead single taken from the album is "Test Drive" and featured label-mate Joe. Since 2007, Sweat has been the host of a nationally syndicated radio program based upon the Quiet storm format. The Keith Sweat Hotel (known as The Quiet Storm with Keith Sweat on WBLS in New York City) is syndicated through Premiere Radio Networks.

Sweat is also the host of a nationally syndicated radio show called The Sweat Hotel, which I s produced and distributed to urban adult contemporary and classic soul radio stations across the U.S. by Premiere Networks, a subsidiary of iHeartMedia, Inc.

Personal life 
From 1992 until 2002, Sweat was married to The Real Housewives of Atlanta star Lisa Wu Hartwell. With her, he had two sons, born in 1995 and 1998.

He also has three daughters, one with Tracy J. He also has a son named Joshua.

Discography

Studio albums
 Make It Last Forever (1987)
 I'll Give All My Love to You (1990)
 Keep It Comin' (1991)
 Get Up on It (1994)
 Keith Sweat (1996)
 Still in the Game (1998)
 Didn't See Me Coming (2000)
 Rebirth (2002)
 A Christmas of Love (2007)
 Just Me (2008)
 Ridin' Solo (2010)
 Til the Morning (2011)
 Dress to Impress (2016)
 Playing for Keeps (2018)

Collaboration albums
Levert.Sweat.Gill (1997) 
LSG2 (2003)

Awards and nominations
American Music Awards
1991: Favorite R&B/Soul Male Artist (nominated)
1997: Favorite Male R&B/Soul Artist (winner)
1997: Favorite R&B/Soul Album for Keith Sweat (nominated)
1998: Favorite Male R&B/Soul Artist (nominated)
2013: Soul Train Lifetime Achievement Award

References

External links
 
 Keith Sweat artist page at VH1.com
 [ Keith Sweat] artist page at AllMusic
 
 Keith Sweat's 'SoulRnB.com' group (videos, photos, discussions, etc.) 
 Keith Sweat 2010 Audio Interview at Soulinterviews.com

1961 births
African-American record producers
Record producers from New York (state)
Singers from New York City
American soul musicians
Living people
Musicians from Atlanta
People from Harlem
American hip hop singers
Atco Records artists
Songwriters from New York (state)
American contemporary R&B singers
LSG (band) members
African-American male songwriters
20th-century African-American male singers
21st-century African-American male singers
New jack swing musicians